Coleophora wiltshirei is a moth of the family Coleophoridae. It is found in Turkey and Iraq.

References

wiltshirei
Moths described in 1959
Moths of Asia